The Northern Territory PGA Championship is a golf tournament on the PGA Tour of Australasia played at Palmerston Golf Course, Palmerston, Northern Territory, Australia. The event was revived in 2016 as Tier 2 event on the tour. Since 2016, total prize money has been A$150,000, except for 2020, which was not an Order of Merit event. The 2016 winner was Jordan Zunic who beat Max McCardle by two strokes.

Winners

Notes

References

External links
Coverage on PGA Tour of Australasia's official site

PGA Tour of Australasia events
Golf tournaments in Australia
Recurring sporting events established in 2016